Frans Gerhard Spits (born 13 June 1946) is a retired field hockey player from the Netherlands. He competed  at the 1964 and 1972 Summer Olympics and finished in fifth and fourth place, respectively. In 1972, he played alongside his elder brother Nico Spits.

Together with his brother he was part of the Dutch team that won the 1973 Men's Hockey World Cup.

References

External links
 

1946 births
Living people
Dutch male field hockey players
Olympic field hockey players of the Netherlands
Field hockey players at the 1968 Summer Olympics
Field hockey players at the 1972 Summer Olympics
Sportspeople from Amstelveen